David Brown (Cherokee: A-wish) (c.1806 – September 14, 1829) was a Cherokee clergyman and translator.

Biography
Brown was born in Wills Valley, Alabama about 1806. Brown's father was of mixed race, part white and part Cherokee. Brown, or A-wish, was, along with his sister Catharine Brown, educated at the school of Cyrus Kingsbury. The school, which had been established by Moravian missionaries, was in Tennessee,  from their home in Alabama. Brown later worked with Catharine in educating and Christianizing their native tribe.

Brown was a preacher and interpreter, and also acted as secretary of the Cherokee national government. In November 1819, he assisted John Arch in the preparation and printing of a Cherokee spelling book. He established a mission at Creek Path, Mississippi in 1820.

In the spring of 1820, Brown went to Cornwall, Connecticut, to attend school. After two years there, he spent a year at Andover Theological Seminary in Massachusetts, preparing for ministry work. Returning to his birthplace, Brown began his missionary work converting the Cherokee people to Christianity. According to a letter written by him in 1825, the Christian religion was generally adopted by the tribe. Brown died September 14, 1829, in Creek Path; he died before the Cherokee people were dispossessed of most of their eastern lands by the United States government in defiance of treaty obligations.

Notes

References

  This source seems to echo the Appletons' presentation.

External links
 
 
 

1800s births
1829 deaths
Cherokee Nation people (1794–1907)
American clergy
19th-century American translators
Andover Theological Seminary alumni
Writers from Alabama
19th-century American clergy
19th-century Native Americans